Reveille is a 1924 British silent drama film directed by George Pearson. It follows some British soldiers during and after the First World War, though Pearson wrote in a January 1924 letter to his cast and crew: 
There is no story, as such. I hate the well-made Story with its Exposition, Denouement, Crisis, etc., as material for my elusive Screen. I confess I cannot write one.

As of August 2010, the film is missing from the BFI National Archive, and is listed as one of the British Film Institute's "75 Most Wanted" lost films, though at least some sequences survive in private hands. It is sometimes confused with the 1925 German film Reveille: The Great Awakening.

Cast
 Betty Balfour as Mick
 Stewart Rome as Nutty
 Ralph Forbes as The Kid
 Sydney Fairbrother as Sophie Fitch
 Frank Stanmore as Whelks
 Henrietta Watson as The Mother
 Guy Phillips as Fred
 Walter Tennyson as Captain
 Charles Ashton as Sam
 Donald Searle as Ted
 Buena Bent as Amelia Fitch
 Simeon Stuart as Colonel

See also
 List of lost films
 List of incomplete or partially lost films

References

External links
BFI 75 Most Wanted entry, with extensive notes

1924 films
1924 drama films
British drama films
British silent feature films
British black-and-white films
Films directed by George Pearson
Lost British films
British World War I films
1924 lost films
Lost drama films
1920s British films
Silent drama films